Germany's Next Topmodel, Cycle 4 is the fourth season of the show that was aired on the German television network ProSieben. The show started airing on 12 February 2009. In difference to former seasons the show saw a significant change as the audition process was completely open this time whereas every model-wannabe got a chance to audition in front of the jury led by Heidi Klum.

The numbers of applications were 1,104 in Düsseldorf, 1,376 in Munich and 18,786 who applied before via mail.

Also the winner of the first cycle of Austria's Next Topmodel, Larissa Marolt was automatically secured a place among the top 20 finalists who will be chosen out of the semifinalists from the different audition cities and the written applications. The winner is 19-year-old Sara Nuru from Munich.

The international destinations for this cycle were set in Los Angeles, Las Vegas, New York City and Singapore.

Episode summaries

Episode 1: Die Schönen und das Biest
Original airdate: 12 February 2009

Out of ca. 1100 girls, the judge picked out 45 girls, and reduced them after and after down to the 15 semi-finalists of Düsseldorf. As a world's first, at this casting all the girls that auditioned got a chance to walk in front of the judges.

Episode 2: Münchener Schickeria
Original airdate: 19 February 2009

Again, out of ca. 1300 girls this time, the judge picked girls out and reduced their number down to the next 15 contestants. This casting was in Munich.

Episode 3: Eisprinzessinnen und ein Kartoffelsack
Original airdate: 26 February 2009

Featured Photographer: Philippe Kerlo

Episode 4: Konkurrenz aus Österreich
Original airdate: 5 March 2009

Challenge winner: Larissa Marolt, Mandy Bork & Tessa Bergmeier
Booked for job: Marie Nasemann
Eliminated: Olivia Berman, Johanna Popp & Daphne Braun
Featured Photographer: Matt McCabe
Special Guests: Lena Gercke, Jared Gold, Giddle Partridge, Clint Catalyst & Jessicka

Episode 5: Aufstand im Heidi-Land
Original airdate: 12 March 2009

Challenge winner: Maria Beckmann
Booked for job: Larissa Marolt, Maria Beckmann & Sara Nuru  
Eliminated: Tessa Bergmeier
Featured Photographer: Patricia von Ah
Special Guest: Melanie Brown

Episode 6: Viva Las Vegas
Original airdate: 19 March 2009

Challenge winner: Mandy Bork
Booked for job: Ira Meindl, Marie Nasemann & Stefanie Thiessing 
Eliminated: Dana Franke
Featured Photographer: Philippe Kerlo

Episode 7: Regen in Downtown L.A.
Original airdate: 26 March 2009

Challenge winner: Aline Bauer
Booked for job: Marie Nasemann
Eliminated: Tamara Busch & Aline Bauer
Featured Photographer: Rankin

Episode 8: Der Sprung ins kalte Wasser
Original airdate: 2 April 2009

Challenge winners: Ira Meindl & Sara Nuru
Booked for job: Maria Beckmann
Eliminated: None
Featured Photographer: Todd Essick
Guest Judge:  Petra Gessulat

Episode 9: Pole Dancing
Original airdate: 9 April 2009
 
Challenge winner: Ira Meindl
Booked for job: Larissa Marolt, Mandy Bork (two Jobs), Maria Beckmann, Marie Nasemann & Sara Nuru     
Eliminated: Stefanie Theissing
Featured Photographer: Walter Chin

Episode 10: Das grosse Kopfschütteln
Original airdate: 16 April 2009

Challenge winner: Larissa Marolt
Booked for job: Jessica Motzkus & Maria Beckmann
Eliminated: Katrina Scharinger
Featured Director: Andreas Kayales
Guest Judge: Bar Refaeli

Episode 11: Sexy Diven
Original airdate: 23 April 2009

Challenge winner: Sarina Nowak
Booked for job: Marie Nasemann
Eliminated: Larissa Marolt
Special Guest: Philipp Plein
Guest Judge: Karolina Kurkova
Featured Photographer: Kristian Schuller

Episode 12: Aloha, Topmodels!
Original airdate: 30 April 2009

Challenge winner: Jessica Motzkus & Ira Meindl 
Booked for job: Mandy Bork
Eliminated: Ira Meindl
Special Guest: Good Charlotte
Guest Judge: Phillip Plein

Episode 13: Bed of Roses
Original airdate: 7 May 2009

Challenge winner: Sara Nuru
Booked for job: Jessica Motzkus & Sara Nuru
Eliminated: Sarina Nowak
Guest Judge: Victoria Beckham
Featured Photographer: Russell James

Episode 14: Cover Shoot
Original airdate: 14 May 2009

A manufacturer of lady shavers cast Sara for a TV Commercial shoot, all the girls did the cover shoot for the winner's Cosmopolitan Germany title and in parallel, all contestants were asked to create a unique photo shoot setting, a challenge Mandy won.

Challenge winner: Mandy Bork
Cast for job: Sara Nuru
Eliminated: Maria Beckmann
Guest Judge: Petra Gesulat
Featured Director: Ben Hartenstein

Episode 15: Du Schwarze, du Blonde, du Braune
Original airdate: 19 May 2009

Eliminated: Jessica Motzkus
Guest Judge: Petra Gesulat
Booked for job: Mandy Bork, Marie Nasemann & Sara Nuru
Special Guest: Michela Maggioni

Episode 16: Das grosse Finale
Original airdate: 21 May 2009

Final three: Mandy Bork, Marie Nasemann & Sara Nuru
Eliminated: Marie Nasemann 
Final two: Mandy Bork & Sara Nuru
Germany's Next Topmodel: Sara Nuru
Special Guests: A-ha, Kelly Clarkson, Queensberry

Contestants
(ages stated are at start of contest)

Summaries

Results table

 The contestant was in danger of elimination
 The contestant was eliminated
 The contestant won the competition

Photo shoot guide
 Episode 1 photo shoot: Düsseldorf
 Episode 2 photo shoot: Munich shooting
 Episode 3 photo shoot: Frostbitten beauty
 Episode 4 photo shoot: Burning car in the desert in pairs
 Episode 5 photo shoot: Hanging from a hot air balloon 
 Episode 6 photo shoot: Brides in B&W
 Episode 7 photo shoot: Bikinis in the rain 
 Episode 8 photo shoot: Underwater 
 Episode 9 photo shoot: Pole dancing 
 Episode 10 commercial: Wonder Bra  
 Episode 11 photo shoot: Famous divas
 Episode 12 photo shoot: Rock stars
 Episode 13 photo shoot: American beauty
 Episode 14 photo shoot: Cosmopolitan covers
 Episode 15 photo shoot: Elle Singapore covers
 Episode 16 photo shoot: Bull riding

Controversy
Sophia Thomalla, daughter of German actress Simone Thomalla, was eliminated in the first round for having a friendship with judge Peyman Amin.

In August 2022 Marie Nasemann revealed that she suffers from the spinal condition Scoliosis. Back in 2009, during the fourth season, her Scoliosis was discussed at a casting for Samsung. The editors of Germany's Next Topmodel tried to make her cry because of her illness and she also reveals: "I found out years later that Samsung would have liked to book me, but from the production side it wasn't allowed".

In September 2022, the winner of the 4th season, Sara Nuru, joined the criticism of the show as she said: "I was not aware of how blatantly young women were treated there. It was as if I had blinders on, a lot is me I wasn't aware of it even as a participant. I'm still horrified by how young women are treated." She added: "With the knowledge I have today, I would not take part in Germany's Next Topmodel again."

In January 2023, the relentless criticism continued when former contestant Tessa Bergmeier (Season 4) criticized the Show and Heidi Klum live in front of an audience of millions during her participation in the 16th season of I'm a Celebrity - Get Me Out of Here. In a conversation with model Papis Loveday, she said: "They screwed me! I found it unfair. I had no idea what kind of light they wanted to put me in. They portrayed me as a bitch. [...] They made me a monster, I wasn't." Bergmeier describes Klum as "super-mega psycho. The devil is in her. [...] She laughs at little girls [...] A person who can torment others without any feeling of guilt. I couldn't continue modelling in Hamburg, no client wanted me anymore." Papis Loveday, who also worked on GNTM, added about Klum: "She only thinks of herself. Nobody can shine more than she does."

In February 2023 Der Spiegel (online) gives a glimpse into the notorious gag contracts that candidates have to sign in order to be able to take part in the Heidi Klum show. According to the Hamburg lawyer Jörg Nabert, these are "illegal gag contracts". The contract binds the women to an agency for two years. A regulation that, according to Nabert, is not customary in the industry. The participants also agree that the recordings "present them in a way that they don't like themselves". According to Der Spiegel (online), the contracts say: "The contributors are aware of any burdens that may result for them". If necessary, “substantive suggestions” would be made and enforced by the show management. Germany's Next Topmodel can thus stylize people like Tessa Bergmeier (Season 4) as "bitches" without them being able to defend themselves effectively afterwards. Heidi Klum's casting show goes further than similar formats with this practice.

In February 2023, the Berliner Zeitung published an article about the show with the headline: "Why isn't Germany’s Next Topmodel actually canceled?" 

In February 2023 at the beginning of the 18th season, Heidi Klum gave a 10-minute speech in which she denied all allegations against her and the show and blamed the candidates themselves. This was once again heavily criticized by both the viewers and the media in Germany. The Berliner Morgenpost wrote: "Everything is wrong, says Klum. She emphasized that 'everything is real' on her show. There is no text or storyline for the models. That's why it's not her fault if a young model feels misrepresented after the broadcast. 'We can only portray a person as they are,' philosophizes Klum. Whether this is true remains questionable. On the one hand, because a story can be cobbled together afterwards that doesn't have to have anything to do with reality. On the other hand, because in the show very young girls in absolutely exceptional and stressful situations meet experienced editors who know exactly what the viewers later want to see on television." Die Welt called Heidi Klum's statement "bizarre". Frankfurter Allgemeine called it a "Catwalk of Shame". Web.de headlined: "Why Heidi Klum's statement is dishonest". Annabelle (magazine) (Switzerland) headlined: "Heidi Klum, this justification went wrong". In an article, Puls24 (Austria) asked whether Heidi Klum practiced perpetrator-victim reversal and Gaslighting. Frankfurter Allgemeine headlined: "This woman only has dollar signs in her eyes" and also assumed that Heidi Klum was doing a perpetrator-victim reversal. BILD asked: "How evil is Heidi Klum really?".

References

External links 
 

Germany's Next Topmodel
2009 German television seasons
Television shows filmed in Los Angeles
Television shows shot in the Las Vegas Valley
Television shows filmed in Miami
Television shows filmed in New York City
Television shows filmed in Hawaii
Television shows filmed in England
Television shows filmed in Singapore